Scottsville is a home rule-class city in Allen County, Kentucky, in the United States. It is the seat of its county. The population was 4,226 during the 2010 U.S. Census.

History
The site along Bays Fork was settled in 1797 and developed into a stagecoach station. The town was laid off in 1816 and established the next year. It was named for Kentucky's 4th governor, Charles Scott. In the early 19th century, it was also known as Allen Court House and Scottville.

Scottsville was the birthplace of what would become the Dollar General nationwide chain of 15,000 stores, with J. L. Turner and his son Cal Turner Sr. opening their first department store there in 1945. In 1955, the Turners began to open more stores, and, in 1968, founded Dollar General Corporation or DOLGEN Corp.

Geography
Scottsville is located at  (36.751504, -86.192692).

Climate
The climate in this area is characterized by hot, humid summers and generally mild to cool winters.  According to the Köppen Climate Classification system, Scottsville has a humid subtropical climate, abbreviated "Cfa" on climate maps.

Demographics

As of the census of 2010, there were 4,226 people, 1,861 households, and 1,130 families residing in the city. The racial makeup of the city was 94.5% White, 2.5% African American, 0.3% Native American, 0.2% Asian, 0.0% Pacific Islander, 0.4% from other races, and 2.1% from two or more races. Hispanic or Latino of any race were 1.4% of the population.

There were 1,861 households, out of which 26.6% had children under the age of 18 living with them, 38.2% were married couples living together, 17.7% had a female householder with no husband present, and 39.3% were non-families. 35.0% of all households were made up of individuals living alone, and 14.5% had someone living alone who was 65 years of age or older. The average household size was 2.22 and the average family size was 2.83.

In the city, the population was spread out, with 23.2% under the age of 18, 7.0% from 20 to 24, 24.6% from 25 to 44, 25.6% from 45 to 64, and 16.5% who were 65 years of age or older. The median age was 38.6 years. For every 100 females, there were 86.66 males. For every 100 females age 18 and over, there were 84.54 males.

The median income for a household in the city was $24,960, and the median income for a family was $36,711. Males had a median income of $31,367 versus $29,750 for females. The per capita income for the city was $13,555. About 20.3% of families and 28.5% of the population were below the poverty line, including 35.0% of those under age 18 and 13.5% of those age 65 or over.

Mennonite community
Scottsville is home of the main settlement of the Noah Hoover Mennonites, also called "Scottsville Mennonites", a branch of Old Order Mennonites. They did not emerge from a single division, as most other Anabaptist groups, but have a long history of divisions and mergers. They moved to Scottsville in 1978, coming from Snyder County, Pennsylvania.

Education
Scottsville Public Schools are part of the Allen County Schools School District. The district has one elementary school, one intermediate school, one middle school, and one high school.

Ninth through twelfth grade students attend Allen County Scottsville High School.

Scottsville has a lending library, the Allen County Public Library.

Media

Scottsville is home to a weekly newspaper, the Citizen-Times, which was founded in 1890. Two radio stations, WVLE (99.3 FM) and WLCK (1250 AM). WVLE recently changed broadcast formats from country to a variety of adult contemporary hits from the past three decades. "The All New Love FM," as the station is now known, also has twice daily news segments covering Scottsville and the rest of Allen County.

Notable people
 Mordecai Ham - Evangelist (born near Scottsville)
 Jim McDaniels - Professional basketball player
 Lattie Moore - Singer, songwriter and musician; Rockabilly Hall of Fame Member
 Charles Napier - Actor and voice actor who was the voice of Duke Phillips
 Harry Pulliam - Sixth President of the National League (Major League Baseball) and Democratic Kentucky legislator
 J.L. Turner - Founder of J.L. Turner and Son, the predecessor of Dollar General, in Scottsville
 Cal Turner - Founder of Dollar General
 Cal Turner Jr. - Former CEO of Dollar General and son of Cal Turner
 Norro Wilson - Nashville songwriter and record producer
 Hillbilly Jim (James Morris) - Professional wrestler

References

External links

 
 Chamber of Commerce
 WVLE 99.3 FM Radio

Cities in Allen County, Kentucky
Cities in Kentucky
County seats in Kentucky